Bweremana (Bweremane) is a village in Kalehe Territory, South Kivu, Democratic Republic of the Congo.

Notes

External links
 Map 

Populated places in South Kivu